New York City's 25th City Council district is one of 51 districts in the New York City Council. It is currently represented by Democrat Shekar Krishnan.

Geography
District 25 is based in the northwestern Queens neighborhoods of Jackson Heights and East Elmhurst, and Elmhurst.

The district overlaps with Queens Community Boards 3 and 4, and with New York's 6th and 14th congressional districts. It also overlaps with the 12th, 13th, and 16th districts of the New York State Senate, and with the 30th, 34th, 35th, 36th, and 39th districts of the New York State Assembly.

Recent election results

2021
In 2019, voters in New York City approved Ballot Question 1, which implemented ranked-choice voting in all local elections. Under the new system, voters have the option to rank up to five candidates for every local office. Voters whose first-choice candidates fare poorly will have their votes redistributed to other candidates in their ranking until one candidate surpasses the 50 percent threshold. If one candidate surpasses 50 percent in first-choice votes, then ranked-choice tabulations will not occur.

The 25th district hosted one of only three 2021 races in which the eventual winner did not receive the highest number of first-choice votes (the other two being the 9th and 50th districts).

2017

2013

References

New York City Council districts